The following structures in eastern Madhya Pradesh have been designated as Monuments of National Importance by the Archaeological Survey of India (ASI).

In this list, the ASI recognized monuments in the eastern part of Madhya Pradesh are described, in the districts Balaghat, Bhind, Chhatarpur, Chhindwara, Damoh, Datia, Ashok Nagar, Jabalpur, Katni, Mandla, Panna, Raisen, Rewa, Sagar, Satna, Seoni, Anuppur, Shahdol, Sidhi and Vidisha. For the western part of Madhya Pradesh, see List of Monuments of National Importance in Madhya Pradesh/West.

|}

References

See also

 Madhya Pradesh/West remainder of divided list of Monuments in Madhya Pradesh
 Lists of monuments in India - for other Monuments of National Importance in India

Madhya Pradesh/East
Monuments and memorials in Madhya Pradesh
Monuments of National Importance in Madhya Pradesh East
Lists of tourist attractions in Madhya Pradesh